Bakay (Бакай) is an Eastern European surname (sometimes transliterated as Bakaj or Bakai). Notable people with the surname include:

Nick Bakay (born 1959), American actor, comedian, writer, producer, and sports commentator
Mykola Bakay (1939–1998), Ukrainian singer, composer, author, and dissident

See also
 Bakaj (Бакай)

Ukrainian-language surnames